The California Office of Legislative Counsel (OLC) (officially the Legislative Counsel Bureau) was founded in 1913 and is a nonpartisan public agency that drafts legislative proposals, prepares legal opinions, and provides other confidential legal services to the Legislature and others. The Bureau also provides computer services, data networking, and related customer services to the Legislature, all while hosting the state's official website where every statute contained within the Codes of California is published. The head of the Bureau, known as the Legislative Counsel, is appointed by a vote of the entire Legislature.

The OLC is separate from the California Legislative Analyst's Office, which reports only to the Joint Legislative Budget Committee and focuses primarily on the state budget.

, the Legislative Counsel of California is Diane F. Boyer-Vine. The main office of the Bureau is located within the State Capitol Building.

References 

 

California law
Government agencies established in 1913
Organizations based in California
1913 establishments in California